The Universidad Hispanoamerica is a major private university in San José, Costa Rica that specializes in business administration, engineering, psychology and medical studies.

The programs, techniques, and facilities are modern — creating driven professionals with internationally recognised degrees. Based in San José, Universidad Hispanoamerica has campuses in other provinces including Cartago and Heredia.

External links
 University website

Universities in Costa Rica